Wakatake is a Japanese surname. It refers to the following:

People
Ryuji Wakatake (born 1987), Nippon Professional Baseball pitcher for the Hokkaido Nippon-Ham Fighters

Other
Wakatake-class destroyer, a type of Japanese destroyer that was used in the Japanese Imperial Navy